Port Joli is a small village located along Highway 103 on the southwest coast of Region of Queens Nova Scotia, Canada. It is about 20 miles from Liverpool, Nova Scotia, the nearest significant town, and 120 miles from Halifax, Nova Scotia, the provincial capital. Port Mouton is about midway between Port Joli and Liverpool. The village's name, Port Joli, comes from the French joli, meaning "pretty." 

The major attraction in Port Joli is the Seaside Adjunct to Kejimkujik National Park, the entrance to which is located about three miles down St. Catherine's Road, which runs from the 103 Highway to the sea. From there, a footpath leads through forest and brush to the beach at Caden Bay. Most of Port Joli's homes are only occupied during the summer months, and the majority of those who do live there year-round are retired. The only public facilities are a United Church of Canada, recently closed and sold, a small general store(also closed), a post office, and a community hall, under heritage renovations. The fishing wharf at the end of St. Catherine's Road was closed in the mid-1990s; a rock breakwater now exists in its place. The few remaining fishermen work from nearby Port L'Herbert and Port Mouton.

Well-known American violist Walter Trampler died here in 1997.  Movie star Dudley Moore often summered here.

Parks
Kejimkujik National Park
Thomas H. Raddall Provincial Park

References

External links

 Kejimkujik National Park
 Thomas H Raddall Provincial Park

Communities in the Region of Queens Municipality
General Service Areas in Nova Scotia